Argos is a global satellite-based system that collects, processes, and disseminates environmental data from fixed and mobile platforms around the world. The worldwide tracking and environmental monitoring system results from Franco-American cooperation. Besides satellite data collection, the Argos system's main feature is the ability to geographically locate the data source from any location on Earth using the Doppler effect.

History and utilization 
Argos was established in 1978 and has provided data to environmental research and protection groups that were previously unobtainable. Many remote automatic weather stations report via Argos. Argos is a component of many global research programs including the Tropical Ocean-Global Atmosphere program (TOGA), Tagging of Pacific Pelagics (TOPP), World Ocean Circulation Experiment (WOCE) and, Argo. There are 22,000 active transmitters (8,000 of which are used in animal tracking) in over 100 countries.

Since the late 1980s, Argos transmitters have been deployed on a large number of marine mammals and sea turtles, and it continues to serve as an important tool for tracking long-distance movements of both coastal and oceanic species. For example, through the upload of data from pressure transducers, it has been possible to obtain data about dive and foraging behavior from unrestrained animals in the wild.

Argos was developed under a Memorandum of Understanding (MOU) between the Centre National d'Études Spatiales (CNES, France), the National Aeronautics and Space Administration (NASA, United States) and the National Oceanic and Atmospheric Administration (NOAA, United States). 

The system utilizes both ground and satellite-based resources to accomplish its mission. These include:

 instruments carried aboard the NOAA Polar Operational Environmental Satellites (POES), the European Organisation for the Exploitation of Meteorological Satellites (EUMETSAT) MetOp satellites, and Indian Space Research Organisation (ISRO) satellites,
 receiving stations around the world
 major processing facilities in Toulouse in France and Lanham, Maryland in the United States.

This fully integrated system works to locate and deliver data from the most remote platforms to the user's desktop, often in near real-time.

Argos is operated by CLS/Argos, based in Toulouse, France, and its United States subsidiary, CLS America. Since June 2019, a new subsidiary named Kinéis has taken over operations and plans to launch a constellation of 16U CubeSats in 2022.

Operating agencies 
The Argos satellite-based system was set up by:
 The Centre National d'Études Spatiales (CNES).
 The U.S. National Oceanic and Atmospheric Administration (NOAA).
 The U.S. National Aeronautics and Space Administration (NASA).

Recent partners in this international cooperative venture are:
 The European Organisation for the Exploitation of Meteorological Satellites (EUMETSAT).
 The Indian Space Research Organisation (ISRO).

Frequencies and data transfer 
Most use of the Argos System makes use of one way data transmission on 401.65 MHz using Argos 2. Each Argos platform features a unique 28-bit ID and the ability to transmit a short 3 to 31 byte message for each transmission. Each platform is restricted to a specified interval, such as every 60 seconds, allowing for a few hundred bytes total per satellite pass. This is enough to contain a couple elements of geographic coordinates or other sensor data. Argos 1 is no longer supported. An important capability of the Argos System is that it can determine transmitter position using Doppler shift on a single satellite. In order to do this accurately, approximately 4-6 transmissions are required in succession during a satellite pass. Accuracy can vary between several hundred meters to several kilometers.

Newer versions of the Argos System, called Argos 3 and Argos 4, offer the most robust modulations, higher symbol rates, larger packet sizes, and interactive data capability. Some satellites feature Argos 3, with varying degrees of functionality. The Argos 3 system features a new downlink signal at 465.9875 MHz. However, due to ground-based alarm system interference issues in the United States, the downlink was disabled on the NOAA-19 satellite. Other newer satellites still transmit on this frequency. The downlink contains date and time, Argos System satellite ephemeris data, and the downlink portion of the newer two-way communication link.

Data collected from the Argos System is transmitted to the ground using two possible methods. If an Argos System ground receiving station is in view of the satellite while the transmitter is also in view, the data is transmitted and processed in near real time. If a ground station is not in view or operational, data is additionally transmitted from the satellite to one of several polar based ground stations. This can introduce additional delay in receiving messages.

Satellite constellation 
The Argos System is served by 7 polar orbiting satellites at an altitude of 850 km and completes a revolution around Earth approximately every 100 minutes. At a vantage point of 850 km, satellites cover approximately 5000 km2 of Earth. Each satellite was intended to be Sun-synchronous, with passes almost at the same solar time each day. Although, due to the age of some satellites, minor drifting does occur. 

Due to the satellite constellations polar orbit, 100% of the Earth is covered by the Argos System. Since pass overlap increase with latitude, the number of daily passes over a transmitter also increase with latitude.

See also 
 Data collection satellite
 DORIS (satellite)
 Transit (satellite), which also used Doppler navigation, but with satellite transmitters and ground-based receivers

References

External links 
 Argos System